The archdeacons in the Diocese of Portsmouth are senior ecclesiastical officers in the Church of England in south-east Hampshire and the Isle of Wight. They currently include: the archdeacon of The Meon, the archdeacon of the Isle of Wight and the archdeacon of Portsdown. Each one has responsibility over a geographical area within the diocese, providing organisational leadership and pastoral support to clergy within their area.

History
The Anglican Diocese of Portsmouth was created on 1 May 1927 from the Diocese of Winchester's archdeaconries of the Isle of Wight and of Portsmouth, which had been created in that diocese on 22 December 1871 and 6 February 1925 respectively.

In November 1999, the Portsmouth archdeaconry was split in two: Lowson remained as Archdeacon of Portsdown and a new Archdeacon of The Meon was appointed.

List of archdeacons

Archdeacons of the Isle of Wight
The archdeaconry was created in Winchester diocese, split from Winchester archdeaconry, in 1871.
1874–16 November 1886 (d.): Francis McDougall (also assistant bishop)
1886–7 September 1906 (d.): Henry Haigh
1906–2 February 1922 (d.): James Macarthur (also Bishop suffragan of Southampton until 1920; afterwards assistant bishop for the island)
1922–1928 (res.): Lewen Tugwell
Wight archdeaconry has been part of Portsmouth diocese since the latter's creation in 1927.
1929–1936 (ret.): Robert McKew
1937–31 August 1948 (d.): Hampton Weekes
1948–1952 (res.): Edward Roberts
1952–1961 (ret.): Alexander Cory (afterward archdeacon emeritus)
1961–1965 (res.): Geoffrey Tiarks
1965–1977 (res.): Ron Scruby
1977–1986 (res.): Freddie Carpenter (afterward archdeacon emeritus)
1986–1996 (ret.): Tony Turner (afterward archdeacon emeritus)
1996–2003 (ret.): Mervyn Banting (afterward archdeacon emeritus)
2003–2006 (res.): Trevor Reader
2006–2011 (res.): Caroline Baston
2011–2018 (res.): Peter Sutton
18 May 20192022 (res.): Peter Leonard
22 January 2023present: Steve Daughtery (also Vicar of Bembridge)

Archdeacons of Portsmouth
1925–1927 (res.): Neville Lovett
1927–1936 (res.): Harold Rodgers
1937–1945 (res.): Harold Hyde-Lees
1945–1952 (res.): Arthur Kitching (also an assistant bishop)
1952–1956 (res.): Edward Roberts
1956–1964 (res.): Michael Peck
1965–1969 (res.): Geoffrey Tiarks
1969–1977 (ret.): Christopher Prior (afterwards archdeacon emeritus)
1977–1985 (ret.): Ron Scruby (afterwards archdeacon emeritus)
1985–1993 (ret.): Norman Crowder (afterwards archdeacon emeritus)
1993–1999 (res.): Graeme Knowles
FebruaryNovember 1999: Chris Lowson (became Archdeacon of Portsdown)
In November 1999, the archdeaconry of Portsmouth was split into Portsdown and The Meon.

Archdeacons of Portsdown
November 1999–2006: Chris Lowson (previously Archdeacon of Portsmouth)
2006–2013 (ret.): Trevor Reader
14 April 20133 July 2019 (res.): Joanne Grenfell (became Bishop of Stepney)
3 July 2019present: vacant
2020 onwards: Jenny Rowley (announced)

Archdeacons of The Meon
1999–2010 (res.): Peter Hancock
11 September 201128 January 2021: Gavin Collins
28 January 2021present (Acting): Will Hughes

References

Archdeacons in the Diocese of Portsmouth
 
 
Lists of Anglicans
Lists of English people